The 2001 National Soccer League Grand Final was held on 3 June 2001 between Wollongong Wolves and South Melbourne at Parramatta Stadium. Soccer Australia deemed Wollongong's 14,000 capacity home ground WIN Stadium too small for the centrepiece of the NSL season. Ironically the crowd attendance was 13,402. Wollongong won the match 2–1, with two goals in as many minutes from Sasho Petrovski and Stuart Young putting them ahead. Although John Anastasiadis got a goal for South Melbourne, it wasn't enough. This won the Wolves their second consecutive National Soccer League championship and their second overall. Matt Horsley won the Joe Marston Medal.

Route to the Final 
As top-two finishers, South Melbourne and Wollongong Wolves were placed into the second week of the final series, with the winner to host the grand final. Wollongong won both legs 2–1 to qualify for the grand final with a 4–2 aggregate. In the preliminary final, South Melbourne defeated fourth-placed Sydney Olympic to qualify for the final.

Soccer Australia chose Parramatta Stadium as the grand final venue, expecting a larger crowd than the WIN Stadium could hold.

The Soccer Australia board initially refused an offer from the Seven Network to show the match live on free-to-air television. The board intended for the match to be played at 3pm, however Seven had pre-existing Australian Football League (AFL) commitments. Eventually, the board changed the time to midday and Seven showed the match live outside of Sydney.

League Standings

Finals Bracket

Match

Details

References

2001 in Australian soccer
NSL Grand Finals
Soccer in Sydney
South Melbourne FC matches
Wollongong Wolves FC